"Angel on My Shoulder" is the second and final single taken released from Pop Idol runner-up Gareth Gates' third studio album, Pictures of the Other Side. Gates describes the song as a song that "everyone can relate to in some way". He also points out that "lyrically, it talks about a figure in one's life who is there when things go wrong. It could be a partner, a friend or a relative".
The single peaked at #22 on the UK Singles Chart and dropped out of the Top 40 the week after.  Due to low sales of the album, and poor sales for his upcoming UK Tour, a third release from the album was cancelled and Gates was dropped from his record label.

Track listing
 "Angel On My Shoulder" - 4:16
 "Horizon Shining" - 3:11

References

2007 singles
Gareth Gates songs
2006 songs
Songs written by Tom Nichols (songwriter)
Universal Records singles